Neal I. Koblitz (born December 24, 1948) is a Professor of Mathematics at the University of Washington. He is also an adjunct professor with the Centre for Applied Cryptographic Research at the University of Waterloo.  He is the creator of hyperelliptic curve cryptography and the independent co-creator of elliptic curve cryptography.

Biography
Koblitz received his undergraduate degree from Harvard University in 1969. While at Harvard, he was a Putnam Fellow in 1968. He received his Ph.D. from Princeton University in 1974 under the direction of Nick Katz.  From 1975 to 1979 he was an instructor at Harvard University.  In 1979 he began working at the University of Washington.

Koblitz's 1981 article "Mathematics as Propaganda" criticized the misuse of mathematics in the social sciences and helped motivate Serge Lang's successful challenge to the nomination of political scientist Samuel P. Huntington to the National Academy of Sciences. In The Mathematical Intelligencer, Koblitz, Steven Weintraub, and Saunders Mac Lane later criticized the arguments of Herbert A. Simon, who had attempted to defend Huntington's work.

He co-invented Elliptic-curve cryptography in 1985, with Victor S. Miller and for this was awarded the Levchin Prize  in 2021.

With his wife Ann Hibner Koblitz, he in 1985 founded the Kovalevskaia Prize, to honour women scientists in developing countries. It was financed from the royalties of Ann Hibner Koblitz's 1983 biography of Sofia Kovalevskaia. Although the awardees have ranged over many fields of science, one of the 2011 winners was a Vietnamese mathematician, Lê Thị Thanh Nhàn. Koblitz is an atheist.

See also
 List of University of Waterloo people
 Gross–Koblitz formula

Selected publications

References

External links
Neal Koblitz's home page

1948 births
Living people
20th-century American mathematicians
21st-century American mathematicians
American atheists
Modern cryptographers
Public-key cryptographers
Putnam Fellows
Number theorists
Harvard University alumni
Princeton University alumni
University of Washington faculty